Counseling is the professional guidance of the individual by utilizing psychological methods especially in collecting case history data, using various techniques of the personal interview, and testing interests and aptitudes.

This is a list of counseling topics.

Therapeutic modalities 

 Academic advising
 Art therapy/dance therapy/drama therapy/music therapy
 Brief psychotherapy
 Career counseling
 Christian counseling
 Co-counseling
 Connectionism
 Consultant (medicine)
 Counseling psychology
 Couples therapy
 Credit counseling
 Crisis hotline
 Disciplinary counseling
 Ecological counseling
 Emotionally focused therapy
 Existential counseling
 Exit counseling
 Family therapy
 Genetic counseling
 Grief counseling
 Intervention
 Licensed professional counselor
 Mental health care navigator
 Mental health counselor
 Narrative therapy
 Navy counselor
 Nouthetic counseling
 Online counseling
 Pastoral counseling
 Person-centered therapy
 Postvention
 Pre-conception counseling
 Pregnancy options counseling
 Professional practice of behavior analysis
 Psychiatrist
 Psychiatric and mental health nursing
 Psychiatric and mental health nurse practitioner
 Re-evaluation Counseling
 Rehabilitation counseling
 School counselor
 Senior peer counseling
 Social work
 Solution-focused brief therapy
 Suicide intervention
 Support group
 Telephone counseling

Common areas 

 Body language
 Conflict resolution
 Conflict resolution research
 Creative problem-solving
 Dialogue
 Dispute resolution
 Emotional conflict
 Experiential education
 Health psychology
 Human potential movement
 Interpersonal communication
 Intrapersonal communication
 Mediation
 Multitheoretical psychotherapy
 Nonverbal communication
 Nonviolent communication
 Problem solving
 Relationship education
 Responsibility assumption
 Stress management

See also 
 List of psychotherapies
 Outline of communication
 Outline of psychology
 Outline of sociology
 Subfields of sociology
 Outline of self
 Psychopharmacology

References 

 
Social work

Outlines of health and fitness
Wikipedia outlines
Counseling